The R350 is a Regional Route in South Africa that connects Bedford and Grahamstown.

Its north-western origin is the R63 at Bedford. From there it heads south, before bending south-east. After about 75 kilometres, it meets the eastern origin of the R400 and shortly after the southern origin of the R344. It passes through Grahamstown, ending just south at the N2.

External links
 Routes Travel Info

References

Regional Routes in the Eastern Cape